The potato is a starchy, tuberous crop. It is the world's fourth-largest food crop, following rice, wheat and corn. The potato was first domesticated by the Andean civilizations in the region of modern-day southern Peru and extreme northwestern Bolivia between 8000 and 5000 BCE. It has since spread around the world and has become a staple crop in many countries.

The following is a list of dishes that use potato as a main ingredient.

See also
 Potato cooking
 List of potato cultivars
 List of sweet potato dishes
 List of vegetable dishes

References

Bibliography

 Buonassisi, Vincenzo (1985). Il nuovo codice della pasta. Rizzoli. .

Potato Dishes